The 2013 World Archery Youth Championships was the 13th edition of World Youth Archery Championships. The event was held in Wuxi, China 13–20 October 2013, and was organised by World Archery. Junior events were held for those under 20, and Cadet for those under 17.

Medal summary

Junior

Recurve

Compound

Cadet

Recurve

Compound

Medal table

References

2013
World Championship
World Archery
A